Prado Reservoir is a reservoir in northwestern Riverside County and southwestern San Bernardino County, a couple of miles west of the city of Corona, in the U.S. state of California. The dam is composed of rock-fill and has a height of 106 feet (32 m) above the original streambed. It was built on the upper end of the Lower Santa Ana River Canyon, where there is a natural constriction in the river. It is below 2,255 square miles (5,840 km2) of the  Santa Ana River watershed. The dam was built by the United States Army Corps of Engineers and was completed in 1941.

Prado Dam and Prado Reservoir provide flood control and water conservation. Their operation is coordinated with the facilities upstream. Prado Reservoir is not a storage reservoir, so water is released as quickly as possible while still allowing for groundwater recharge. When the water level reaches the top of the buffer pool, whose size changes depending on time of year, water is released at the maximum rate that the downstream channel will safely allow. Since this is 2.3 and 7.1 percent of the reservoir's total capacity, respectively, the reservoir is usually fairly empty.

See also
List of dams and reservoirs in California
List of lakes in California
List of largest reservoirs of California

References 
 United States Army Corps of Engineers - Prado Dam
 United States Army Corps of Engineers - Prado Dam Brochure

Reservoirs in Riverside County, California
Reservoirs in San Bernardino County, California
Reservoirs in California
Reservoirs in Southern California